Nelson Bay is a significant township of the Port Stephens local government area in the Hunter Region of New South Wales, Australia. At the 2021 census, Nelson Bay had a population of 6,141.

It is a major tourism centre, particularly for dolphin and whale watching, surfing, diving, fishing and other recreational aquatic activities. The eastern boundaries of Nelson Bay lie within the Tomaree National Park while the southeastern section is almost entirely within the park. Nelson Head Light, an unusual lighthouse built in 1875, is positioned on the northeast corner.

Early settlers
Early settlers included the Dalton family, the patriarch being Captain John Dalton who sailed his ship SS Kingsley to Sydney with fresh marine produce from Port Stephens. He donated land from his holding for the Methodist Church, and for a school.

Transport

Climate
Nelson Bay has a maritime-influenced humid subtropical climate (Cfa) with warm humid summers, damp autumns, cool wet winters and relatively dry springs. The suburb is relatively sunny, receiving 117.8 clear days annually. Despite the high amount of rainfall throughout the year (due to its exposed location on a peninsula), the rain days are relatively few, barely reaching over 10 days per month.

Notes

References

External links
 Port Stephens Visitors Centre
 Nelson Bay at Australian Explorer
 Nelson Bay Online & Internet Cafe
 Local radio station Bay FM 99.3
 The Weekender Guide to Nelson Bay
 

Suburbs of Port Stephens Council
Bays of New South Wales
Marinas in Australia
Beaches of New South Wales